is a Japanese cross-country skier. He competed at the 1984, 1988, 1992 and the 1994 Winter Olympics.

References

1962 births
Living people
Japanese male cross-country skiers
Olympic cross-country skiers of Japan
Cross-country skiers at the 1984 Winter Olympics
Cross-country skiers at the 1988 Winter Olympics
Cross-country skiers at the 1992 Winter Olympics
Cross-country skiers at the 1994 Winter Olympics
Sportspeople from Aomori Prefecture
Asian Games medalists in cross-country skiing
Cross-country skiers at the 1986 Asian Winter Games
Cross-country skiers at the 1990 Asian Winter Games
Asian Games gold medalists for Japan
Asian Games silver medalists for Japan
Medalists at the 1986 Asian Winter Games
Medalists at the 1990 Asian Winter Games
20th-century Japanese people